The 1932 Cincinnati Bearcats football team was an American football team that represented the University of Cincinnati as a member of the Buckeye Athletic Association during the 1932 college football season. In their second season under head coach Dana M. King, the Bearcats compiled a 7–2 record (2–2 against conference opponents).

Schedule

References

Cincinnati
Cincinnati Bearcats football seasons
Cincinnati Bearcats football